Pilzno  is a town in Poland, in Subcarpathian Voivodeship, in Dębica County.  It has 4,943 inhabitants as of 2018. It is located at the junction of important roads – West-East European E40 Highway, and National Road 73 (Droga Krajowa nr. 73, DK 73) to Jasło, but at the same time, it has no railroad station, even though in 1939 Polish government began construction of the Dębica – Jasło line, via Pilzno. The project was never completed.

History
Granted Magdeburg rights in 1354 by King Kazimierz Wielki, Pilzno has a rich history. In the Polish-Lithuanian Commonwealth it was the capital of a powiat, located in the Sandomierz Voivodeship. Most important historical building is St. John's church, with the famous Shrine and Painting of Our Lady of Consolation, founded around 1256. It is located near the medieval market square.

In the early days of Polish statehood, the area of Pilzno probably belonged to the Vistulans. The name of the town for the first time appears in 1105, in a document issued by Papal legate Gilles, who confirmed that Benedictine monks from Tyniec owned numerous villages and settlements along the Wisłoka river, including Pilzno. In 1328, Benedictine abbot Michał from Tyniec named first sołtys of Pilzno. In 1354, the village became a royal possession, and King Kazimierz Wielki granted it Magdeburg rights. At that time, Pilzno was conveniently located at the intersection of two busy merchant routes: west–east (from Kraków to Red Ruthenia), and north–south (from Sandomierz to the Kingdom of Hungary). The town belonged to the Duchy of Sandomierz, which later became Sandomierz Voivodeship. It was the capital of Pilzno County, which included Tarnów, Dębica, Ropczyce, Mielec, and Sędziszów Małopolski.

It is not known when the painting of Our Lady of Consolation was brought to Pilzno. It was already in the town in 1241, when Lesser Poland was invaded by the Mongols. The town was attacked by Asiatic hordes again in 1287, and the painting became famous. King Władysław Łokietek visited Pilzno’s parish church and prayed before the painting, and in 1340, knights of King Kazimierz Wielki, on their way to Red Ruthenia, stopped here as well. In 1386, the royal couple – King Władysław Jagiełło and his wife, Queen Jadwiga of Poland prayed here as well. In the Battle of Grunwald, the flag of knights of Sandomierz Land included, among others, a copy of the painting. In the late Middle Ages, Pilzno was burned twice. First in 1474, during the Polish – Hungarian war, and then in 1498, during a Tatar raid. The painting was destroyed in 1474, and ca. 1500, it was re-created, by a German artist Lazarus Gertner. At that time, Pilzno was one of the most important towns of southeastern Lesser Poland. Several artisans of different skills were active here, and town council profited from tolls collected for crossing the bridge over the Wisłoka. There were fairs which attracted a number of people, and local merchants traded with merchants from Hungary, buying from them Hungarian wines, which were very popular in Poland. Due to its Magdeburg rights charter, Pilzno has a medieval town square, in the middle of which there was a town hall, which does not exist now. Apart from parish church, Pilzno had a second church, founded by King Jagiełło, and built in 1403.

On March 18, 1657, troops of Transilvanian Prince George II Rakoczi, together with their Cossack allies, attacked Pilzno, plundering the town and burning it to the ground. Like in virtually all towns and cities of Lesser Poland, the Deluge had a disastrous impact on Pilzno. Furthermore, there were several epidemics (1641, 1652, 1665, 1675), which decimated town’s population. In 1772, when Pilzno was annexed by the Habsburg Empire (see Partitions of Poland), it had 82 houses. Its historic town hall was in such a bad shape that it was demolished in 1774. Pilzno remained part of Galicia until late autumn of 1918. Also, the area of Pilzno was a center of the Galician slaughter. In 1869, Pilzno County was re-created. In the late 19th century, town’s market square was paved, the complex of a high school was built, and in 1914, the population of the town was 2,400, with a significant Jewish minority, which made one-third of residents and which owned most local stores.

During World War I Pilzno was occupied by Russians from September 1914 to May 1915. The Russians were driven away on May 6, 1915, and on November 1, 1918, Pilzno became independent, when local civil servants destroyed Austrian symbols. In 1931, the seat of the county was moved to Ropczyce (later to Dębica), despite protests of residents. Furthermore, when in 1936 Dębica became one of main centers of the Central Industrial Region, Pilzno’s importance was further weakened, and it remained so until now.

Most important point of interest of the town is a local parish church, which traces back to 1256. It was remodelled in 1370 and in 1482, after the Hungarian invasion of 1474. Pilzno also has a Carmelite monastery with a church (15th century), tenement houses in the market square (19th century), and World War I military cemeteries. A number of Polish Chicagoans hail from Pilzno, and in 2004 their organization the 'Pilzno' Society of Chicago Klub Pilźnian festively celebrated its 80th anniversary

Notable residents 

 Dershowitz family
 Karol Irzykowski (1873–1944), writer and literary critic
 Sebastian Petrycy (1554–1626), a Polish philosopher and physician
 Joseph Singer (1915–2006), first Pilzner Rav in the United States
 Jan "Ciężki" Tarnowski (c. 1479–1527), starost of this town
 Jan Tarło (?–1550), starost of this town
 Jan Tarło (1527–1587), starost of this town
 Janusz Wolański (born 1979), Polish midfielder

See also 
 Walddeutsche
 Pilzno (Hasidic dynasty)

References 

Cities and towns in Podkarpackie Voivodeship
Dębica County
Lesser Poland
Sandomierz Voivodeship
Kingdom of Galicia and Lodomeria
Kraków Voivodeship (1919–1939)